Kashf is a 2020 Pakistani spiritual romantic drama television series, premiered on Hum TV on 7 April 2020. It is written by Imran Nazeer, developed by Shahzad Javed, Head of Content, HUM TV, directed by Danish Nawaz and produced by Momina Duraid. The show stars Hira Mani in a titular role of Kashf, who has engaged in recurrent nightmares that eventually take the shape of reality. The supporting cast include Junaid Khan, Samina Ahmad, Waseem Abbas, Lubna Aslam and Hajra Khan. Music for the series has been composed and produced by Hamza Akram.

Plot summary 
Kashf (Hira Mani) is a gifted girl who has acquired the ability to foresee future events through her dreams, which are nightmares in most cases about the unfortunate events which will happen in her life. As Kashf's family is a set of greedy people, especially her father and her grandmother, his father, Imtiaz, uses Kashf's ability as an advantage and a way to overcome their financial crisis. Kashf's father is the taya of Wajdan (Junaid Khan) who is the fiancé of Kashf, though they haven't been married for years because of Kashf's father's behaviour. Ashi, the sister of Imtiaz, is a breadwinner of the family after her divorce from the false mentor MatiUllah. She strongly opposes her brother Imtiaz, kashf's father, when he makes her work with MatiUllah, who runs an Islamic sanctuary. After a change of events they open their own sanctuary and exploit people in the name of donations. The deal is that Kashf will sit and women from the neighbourhood can ask her about their lives, and then she can tell them the next day through her dreams. Kashf's father doesn't understand that her ability is a natural ability and she cannot foresee the future of someone by herself. Kashf has no control over anything and is very lonely. After Kashf sees recurring nightmares about her family getting ruined, specifically recurring nightmares about her younger sister, Erum, marrying a man who has bad intentions, she insists on getting Erum married with the right person. Wajdan fulfills Imtiaz's condition of giving his home to Imtiaz in order to marry Kashf on the same day Kashf's younger sister Erum was getting married. However Imtiaz had no intention of marrying them; he simply wanted possession of the home. He wanted to marry Wajdan to his youngest daughter Zoya. Zoya is shown as a greedy and ill-willed sister who will stop at nothing to win over Wajdan, with whom she is in love with. Zoya, who had no idea of her father's plan to get her married to Wajdan whom she loved, made plans with matiUllah to tarnish Kashf's reputation.They succeeded in doing so and Imtiaz, to save the sanctuary, married Kashf to Wajdan.

It is later shown that Imtiaz gets rich because of Kashf and they soon move into their new large home. On the other hand, Wajdan and Kashf both spend their honeymoon out of city and planned to settle there. Despite this, Kashf's father gets angry as their sanctuary starts to become unpopular and people demand to meet Kashf. However, seeing as their plan backfired, in order to bring Kashf back, MatiUllah and Zoya announced their marriage. In shock, Kashf returned and tried to stop Zoya from marrying that monster. Wajdan got irritated by Kashf's obedient attitude and told her to take a stand for herself and stop getting exploited in the name of the sanctuary. 
MatiUllah got Imtiaz in jail through his connections as Zoya disagreed to marry him at the exact moment. Wajdan had an accident and took an injury to his head. Having no choice, Kashf joined MatiUllah's sanctuary. After Wajdan was back, he was brainwashed by Zoya and his mum. Already in a state of confusion because of his head injury, he divorced Kashf. As Wajdan started losing his senses after doing so, Kashf started losing the will to live.
Seeing her dead body, her father begging and Wajdan dancing madly, Kashf woke up in a horrified state. After a few months, Wajdan's mum and Imtiaz got Zoya married to a semi-insane Wajdan without knowing his state of mind. On their wedding night, Wajdan told her that he hated her and loved Kashf, completely lost his senses and ran away. Zoya was suffering because of all the horrible things she had done before.
The next day, Kashf died in a state of sujood and left the whole family in a state of disbelief. Wajdan was seen cleaning a public sanctuary while Kashf's body was being carried to the grave. In the last scene, MatiUllah is seen making a sincere prayer for Kashf.

Cast 

 Hira Mani as Kashf Bint-e-Imtiaz 
 Junaid Khan as Wajdaan Ibn Fayaaz
 Waseem Abbas as Imtiaz Ahmed
 Munazzah Arif as Dilshad; Kashf's mother
 Lubna Aslam/Asma Abbas as Rashida; Wajdaan's mother
 Maryam Noor as Shumaila
 Samina Ahmad as Kashf's grandmother
 Hajra Khan as Aisha; "Ashi" Kashf's paternal aunt
 Sabeena Farooq as Zoya Wajdan
 Shehryar Zaidi as Fayaaz Ahmed; Wajdan's father
 Saleem Mairaj as Matiullah Shah; Ashi's Ex-Husband
 Tanya Hussain as Erum Waleed 
 Amir Qureshi as Aisha's Love interest
 Agha Talal
 Abul Hasan as Babar; Erum's Ex-Fiancé

Production 
On 14 November 2019, Junaid.Khan revealed through Instagram about his upcoming project. In December 2019, it was reported that Hira Mani will be paired opposite Khan in lead.

The first teaser was released on 20 March 2020. It is the fourth project featuring Mani and Khan together after Sun Yaara (2016), Thays (2018) and Mohabbat Na Kariyo while both are second time collaborating with writer Imran Nazeer after Thays and director Danish Nawaz after Suna Yaara.

Episodes

Soundtrack

The Original soundtrack is sung and composed by Hamza Akram Qawwal, Taimoor Akram and Abdul Akram on lyrics of Shah Hussain.

Awards and nominations

References

External links
 Official website

Hum TV original programming
2020 Pakistani television series debuts
Pakistani drama television series
Urdu-language television shows